Heptodon is an extinct genus of tapir-type herbivore of the family Helaletidae endemic to North America during the Early Eocene.

The shape of the skull suggests that it probably lacked the characteristic tapir trunk. Instead it probably had a slightly elongated, fleshy upper lip, like its relative Helaletes.

See also
Fossil Butte National Monument

References

Eocene odd-toed ungulates
Eocene mammals of North America
Taxa named by Edward Drinker Cope
Fossil taxa described in 1882